Shirán is a town in Northern Peru, located in the district of Poroto in Trujillo Province of the region La Libertad. This town is located some 40 km east of Trujillo city in the Valley of Moche.

Nearby cities
Trujillo, Peru
Víctor Larco Herrera
Otuzco

See also
La Libertad Region
Simbal
Moche River

External links
Location of Shirán by Wikimapia

References

Populated places in La Libertad Region